Keri Lynn Russell (born March 23, 1976) is an American actress. She portrayed the titular character on the drama series Felicity (1998–2002), which won her a Golden Globe Award, and Elizabeth Jennings on the FX spy thriller series The Americans (2013–2018), which earned her nominations for several Primetime Emmy and Golden Globe Awards.

Russell appeared in the films Honey, I Blew Up the Kid (1992), We Were Soldiers (2002), Mission: Impossible III (2006), Waitress (2007), August Rush (2007), Extraordinary Measures (2010), Dawn of the Planet of the Apes (2014), Free State of Jones (2016), Star Wars: The Rise of Skywalker (2019), Antlers (2021), and Cocaine Bear (2023). In 2017, she received a star on the Hollywood Walk of Fame.

Early life 
Keri Lynn Russell was born on March 23, 1976, in Fountain Valley, California, the daughter of Stephanie Stephens, a homemaker, and David Russell, a Nissan Motors executive. She has an older brother, Todd, and a younger sister, Julie. The family lived in Coppell, Texas; Mesa, Arizona; and Highlands Ranch, Colorado, moving frequently due to her father's work. Russell's dancing earned her a spot on The Mickey Mouse Club.

Career

1990s 
Russell first appeared on television at age 15 as a cast member of the All-New Mickey Mouse Club variety show on the Disney Channel. She was on the show from 1991 to 1994, encompassing seasons four to six.

In 1992, Russell appeared in Honey, I Blew Up the Kid and in 1993, she had a role on the sitcom Boy Meets World as character Mr. Feeny's niece. Russell appeared on Married... with Children in a 1995 episode ("Radio Free Trumaine", production 9.24). She subsequently starred in several film and television roles, including the 1996 made-for-television film The Babysitter's Seduction. That year she also had a role on the short-lived soap opera series Malibu Shores.

In 1994, Russell appeared as the "other woman" in Bon Jovi's music video "Always". In 1997, she appeared in two episodes of Roar.

From 1998 to 2002, Russell starred as the title character on the successful WB Network series Felicity. In 1999, she won a Golden Globe for the role. Russell's long, curly hair was one of her character's defining characteristics and her hairstyle change at the beginning of the show's second season was speculated by some to have caused a significant drop in the show's ratings.

2000s 
During the show's run, Russell appeared in the films Eight Days a Week, The Curve and Mad About Mambo, all of which received only limited releases in North America. Her next role was in the film We Were Soldiers (2002), playing the wife of a United States serviceman during the Vietnam War. The film was released two months before the end of Felicitys run.

When Felicity ended, Russell moved to New York City and made her off-Broadway stage debut in 2004 in Neil LaBute's Fat Pig. In 2005, she returned to television and film, beginning with an appearance in the Hallmark Hall of Fame television movie The Magic of Ordinary Days, theatrical film The Upside of Anger and the television miniseries Into the West. In 2005, director J. J. Abrams asked Russell to join the cast of Mission: Impossible III and she accepted. She was screen tested for the role of Lois Lane in Superman Returns, but lost the role to Kate Bosworth.

In mid-2006, Russell was chosen to be a celebrity spokeswoman for CoverGirl cosmetics. In the summer of 2007, Russell appeared in The Keri Kronicles, a reality show sitcom sponsored by CoverGirl and airing on MySpace; the show was filmed at Russell's home in Manhattan and spotlighted her life. Also in 2007, she played Melody on the NBC show Scrubs.

Russell next starred in the film Waitress, which marked the fourth time she played a pregnant woman. Her performance was positively received by critics, with Michael Sragow of The Baltimore Sun writing that Russell's performance had "aesthetic character" and "wields tenderness and fierceness with quiet heat". In 2007, Russell also completed roles in Grimm Love (titled Rohtenburg for its German release), in which she played Katie Armstrong, a graduate student who writes her thesis on an infamous cannibal murder case and the thriller The Girl in the Park.

Russell next appeared in August Rush, released in November 2007. She also appeared on the cover of the New York Posts Page Six magazine on November 11, 2007. Russell later appeared in Bedtime Stories. In an appearance on The View on December 15, 2008, Russell said she got the part because Adam Sandler's wife Jackie had seen her in Waitress and suggested her for the movie. Russell voiced Wonder Woman in a direct-to-video animated feature released on March 3, 2009.

2010s 
Russell starred in the Tom Vaughan-helmed Extraordinary Measures for CBS Films. The drama, which started filming on April 6, 2009, and was released on January 22, 2010, was the first film to go into production for the new company. Russell played Aileen Crowley, a mother who tries to build a normal home life for her sick children while her husband and an unconventional scientist race against time to find a cure.

Russell starred in the Fox series Running Wilde from 2010 to 2011.

From 2013 to 2018, she starred in the FX drama series The Americans, playing Elizabeth Jennings, a deep-undercover Russian KGB spy living as an American in the 1980s Cold War era. She appeared opposite Matthew Rhys, who portrays her character's husband and spy partner. Russell and Rhys became partners in real life during this time. The series ended after six seasons.

In 2013, Russell starred in the science-fiction horror film Dark Skies and the romantic comedy film Austenland. In 2014, Russell starred in the science fiction action film Dawn of the Planet of the Apes, a sequel to the 2011 film Rise of the Planet of the Apes. She later starred as Serena Knight in the 2016 historical war film Free State of Jones.

In July 2018,  Russell was announced to have joined the cast of the film Star Wars: The Rise of Skywalker, which was released on December 20, 2019. The film reunited her with J.J. Abrams, with whom she had worked on Felicity and Mission: Impossible III. In August 2018,  Russell was announced to star as Anna in the first Broadway revival of Lanford Wilson's play Burn This. Performances began in March 2019 at the Hudson Theatre.

2020s 
On March 16, 2023 Netflix announced that Russell will star in The Diplomat, a political series from The West Wing writer/producer Debora Cahn. The series will premiere on April 20, 2023.

Personal life 
In 2006, Russell became engaged to Shane Deary, a Brooklyn-based contractor she met through mutual friends. The couple married in New York on February 14, 2007. They have two children together, a son born in 2007 and a daughter born in 2011. Russell and Deary separated in early 2013 and divorced in mid-2014. Since 2014, Russell has been in a relationship with her co-star in The Americans, Matthew Rhys. They have a son, born in 2016. In interviews conducted in 2021, Russell and Rhys referred to each other as wife and husband.

Filmography

Film

Television

Video game

Awards and nominations

References

External links 

 
 

1976 births
20th-century American actresses
21st-century American actresses
Actresses from Arizona
Actresses from Colorado
Actresses from Orange County, California
Actresses from Texas
American child actresses
American film actresses
American television actresses
American voice actresses
Best Drama Actress Golden Globe (television) winners
Living people
Mouseketeers
People from Coppell, Texas
People from Fountain Valley, California
People from Highlands Ranch, Colorado
People from Mesa, Arizona